Xbox Exhibition was a game demo compilation series from Microsoft Game Studios to advertise and preview upcoming Xbox games. The discs contained several playable game demos, game trailers, video content from G4 TV, music videos, and music from indie artists which were downloadable to the Xbox's hard drive. The availability of these demos varied by region.

With the advent of the Xbox 360, distribution of demos switched to free downloads from the Xbox Live Marketplace. In total there were seven Xbox Exhibition discs released over two years. The last release was volume 7 in December 2004.

Discs 

 Volume 1 (January 1, 2002)
 Nine playable game demos: Halo: Combat Evolved, Madden NFL 2003, NFL Fever 2003, Panzer Dragoon Orta, Quantum Redshift, Tom Clancy's Splinter Cell, TimeSplitters 2, ToeJam & Earl III: Mission to Earth, and Whacked!. 
 Downloads: Dead or Alive 3 booster pack costumes, two downloadable saves for Project Gotham Racing, and two save files for Rallisport Challenge. 
 Music and music videos from: Death Cab for Cutie, John Vanderslice,  Rilo Kiley, The Dismemberment Plan, and The Long Winters.

 Volume 2 (March 5, 2003)
 Nine playable game demos: All-Star Baseball 2004, Capcom vs. SNK 2 EO, Indiana Jones and the Emperor's Tomb, Kung Fu Chaos, MechAssault, MX Superfly, NBA Inside Drive 2003, Tom Clancy's Ghost Recon, and Vexx. 
 Downloads: NFL Fever 2003 roster update, and new characters and environments for ToeJam & Earl III: Mission to Earth and MX Superfly.

 Volume 3 (July 17, 2003)
 Nine playable game demos: Apex, ATV Quad Power Racing 2, Brute Force, Gladius, MLB Inside Pitch 2003, MotoGP 2, NBA Street Vol. 2, Return to Castle Wolfenstein: Tides of War, Tao Feng: Fist of the Lotus. 
 Downloads: Levels and skins for RLH: Run Like Hell, and an extra mission for Splinter Cell called the "Kola Cell" level. 
 Music and music videos from: Depswa, Queens of the Stone Age, Rooney, ...And You Will Know Us by the Trail of Dead, and Woven.

 Volume 4 (November 26, 2003)
 Nine playable game demos: ESPN NBA Basketball, Grabbed by the Ghoulies, Magic the Gathering: Battlegrounds, Metal Arms: Glitch in the System, Prince of Persia: The Sands of Time, Project Gotham Racing 2, Tom Clancy's Rainbow Six 3, Teenage Mutant Ninja Turtles, and Voodoo Vince. 
 Downloads: Levels for Ghost Recon: Island Thunder, Return to Castle Wolfenstein: Tides of War, and Star Wars: The Clone Wars, and four new maps for Unreal Championship.

 Volume 5 (May 27, 2004)
 Seven playable game demos: NBA Ballers, Psi-Ops: The Mindgate Conspiracy, Metal Slug 3, Ninja Gaiden, Shadow Ops: Red Mercury, RalliSport Challenge 2, The Chronicles of Riddick: Escape from Butcher Bay. 
 Extras: G4 - TV 4 Gamers Episodes: Cheat G4's tips and tricks to master Star Wars Knights of the Old Republic; Pulse Get New York Yankee Jason Giambi's insights on ESPN Major League Baseball 

 Volume 6 (November 17, 2004)
 Seven playable game demos: Full Spectrum Warrior, Tom Clancy's Rainbow Six 3: Black Arrow, NCAA Football 2005, Men of Valor, OutRun 2, Second Sight, Blinx 2: Masters of Time and Space

 Volume 7 (December 2004)
 Seven playable game demos: Burnout 3: Takedown, Dead or Alive Ultimate, ESPN NHL 2K5, Kingdom Under Fire: The Crusaders, Star Wars Republic Commando, The Incredibles, and The SpongeBob SquarePants Movie.

See also 

 Game demo
 Official Xbox Magazine
 Xbox Live Marketplace

References

External links 
 Exhibition Volume 07

Microsoft game compilations
Xbox games
Xbox-only games